The 2011–12 Aviva Premiership was the 25th season of the top flight English domestic rugby union competition and the second one to be sponsored by Aviva. The reigning champions entering the season were Saracens, who had claimed their first title after defeating Leicester Tigers in the 2011 final. Worcester Warriors had been promoted as champions from the 2010–11 RFU Championship at the first attempt.

Summary
Harlequins won their first title after defeating Leicester Tigers in the final at Twickenham having also topped the regular season table. Newcastle Falcons were relegated on the last day of the season. It was the second time that Newcastle have been relegated from the top flight since the leagues began and the first time since the 1993–94 Premiership Rugby season.

As usual, round 1 included the London Double Header at Twickenham, the eighth instance since its inception in 2004.

Rule changes
This season saw the first major change in the Premiership's salary cap, which at the time stood at £4 million per team. In what is now a permanent feature of the cap system, academy credits were introduced. Each team receives a £30,000 credit for every home-grown player in their senior squad, with a maximum of eight such credits. In addition, a standard provision of the cap system that applies only in seasons that run up against the Rugby World Cup provided each team with a credit of £30,000 for each senior squad player that participated in the World Cup.

Teams
Twelve teams compete in the league – the top eleven teams from the previous season and Worcester Warriors who were promoted from the 2010–11 RFU Championship after a top flight absence of one year. They replaced Leeds Carnege who were relegated after two years in the top flight.

Stadiums and locations

Pre-season
The 2011 edition of the Premiership Rugby Sevens Series began on 15 July 2011 at The Recreation Ground, continued on 22 July at Franklin's Gardens and 29 July at Edgeley Park.  This was the first opportunity of the season for any of the teams competing in the Premiership to win a trophy.  The finals were held on 5 August 2011 at The Stoop and the Series was won by Newcastle Falcons.

Table

Regular season

Round 1

Round 2

Round 3

Round 4

Round 5

Round 6

Round 7

Round 8

Round 9

Round 10

Round 11

Round 12

Round 13

Round 14

Round 15

Round 16

Round 17

Round 18

Round 19

Round 20

Round 21

Round 22

Play-offs
As in previous seasons, the top four teams in the Premiership table, following the conclusion of the regular season, contest the play-off semi-finals in a 1st vs 4th and 2nd vs 3rd format, with the higher ranking team having home advantage. The two winners of the semi-finals then meet in the Premiership Final at Twickenham on 26 May 2012.

Bracket

Semi-finals

Final

Leading scorers
Note: Flags indicate national union as has been defined under WR eligibility rules. Players may hold more than one non-WR nationality.

Most points
Source:

Most tries
Source:

Season attendances

By club

Notes

References

External links
2011–12 English Premiership Full Results

 
2011-12
 
England